Jörg Vaihinger (born 8 October 1962) is a retired West German sprinter. He competed in the 4 × 400 m relay at the 1984, 1988 and 1992 Olympics and won a bronze medal in 1988. He won a silver medal in this event at the 1983 World Championships. After retiring from competitions he worked in his own bank in Stuttgart.

References

West German male sprinters
Olympic bronze medalists for West Germany
Athletes (track and field) at the 1984 Summer Olympics
Athletes (track and field) at the 1988 Summer Olympics
Athletes (track and field) at the 1992 Summer Olympics
Olympic athletes of West Germany
Olympic athletes of Germany
1962 births
Living people
World Athletics Championships medalists
World Athletics Championships athletes for West Germany
Medalists at the 1988 Summer Olympics
Olympic bronze medalists in athletics (track and field)
Sportspeople from Dortmund
20th-century German people
21st-century German people